Maroon is the fifth full-length studio album by Barenaked Ladies. The album was the follow-up to 1998's Stunt, the band's most successful album in the United States. Maroon debuted at No. 1 in Canada (their second to reach No. 1 after their 1992's debut Gordon) and No. 5 on the U.S. Billboard 200. In its first week, the album sold 17,800 copies in Canada and just under 128,000 in the U.S. It has sold at least 1 million copies in the U.S. alone. The album spawned three hit singles : "Pinch Me", "Too Little Too Late" and "Falling for the First Time".

Unlike past albums, the songs came almost entirely from the pairing of Page/Robertson. One track, "Baby Seat", was written by Page with longtime songwriting partner, Stephen Duffy. This was the last Page/Duffy track that Barenaked Ladies would release, starting a policy of keeping the writing within the band on their next album. "Hidden Sun", written while Hearn was in the hospital, appears as a hidden track on most copies of the album. As with each of their early albums, the band recorded one song, "Humour of the Situation", completely naked.

The band recorded 17 tracks for the album; Tracks recorded for this album but omitted from the finished record include: "Powder Blue" (appears on the US "Pinch Me" single), "Inline Bowline" (appears as an extra track on some international versions, and is on the Australian "Pinch Me" single), "Born Human" (appears on the Australian "Pinch Me" single, re-recorded for Hearn's album Night Light) and "Half a Heart" (re-recorded for the Barenaked Ladies Are Me sessions before the Maroon sessions version was later released on Stop Us If You've Heard This One Before!). "That's All, That's All" was also written for the album, and was later recorded for Page's The Vanity Project.

The album was the first Barenaked Ladies album released on DVD-Audio in a 5.1 surround sound mix. In 2020, a 20th Anniversary Edition was released digitally, and was announced for a vinyl release in early 2021. The 20th Anniversary Edition includes contains the three contemporary B-sides recorded for the album (not including "Half a Heart") as well as a demo version of "Falling for the First Time", and an "alternate" version of "Green Christmas" previously . Also, "Hidden Sun" is separated into its own track.

Track listing

Personnel

Barenaked Ladies
 Jim Creeggan – electric bass (1, 2, 3, 5, 8, 9, 10, 11), background vocals (1, 4, 5, 6, 9, 11, 12), handclaps (1, 4), violin (3, 11), viola (3, 7, 11, 12), baritone guitar (4), glockenspiel (4), electric double bass (6, 12), double bass (4, 6, 7, 11), arco double bass (12)
 Kevin Hearn – organ (1, 2, 3, 8, 9), synthesizer (5, 6, 10, 12), piano (2, 5, 6, 8, 9, 10), accordion (2), glockenspiel (7), electric piano (3, 4), background vocals (1, 5, 6, 7, 9, 12), clavinet (1, 2), handclaps (1) , sampling (1, 2, 7, 9, 12), baritone guitar (7), vocoder (8), electric guitar (11), keyboards (7, 11), melodica (11), lead vocals  (13)
 Steven Page – lead vocals (1, 2, 4, 6, 7, 8, 9, 10, 11, 12), background vocals (1, 3, 5, 6), electric guitars (all), acoustic guitar (11), flute (12), recorder (11)
 Ed Robertson – lead vocals (3, 5), background vocals (1, 2, 4, 6, 7, 8, 9, 10, 11, 12), acoustic guitar (1, 3, 4, 5, 6, 7, 8), electric guitar (all), tambourine (10), 12-string guitar (11), handclaps (1, 4), wah-wah guitar (6), cabasa (10), mandolin (11), banjo (12)
 Tyler Stewart – castanets (7), drums (1, 2, 3, 4, 5, 6, 7, 8, 9, 11), tambourine (1, 4, 6, 7, 8, 9, 11), bells (11), handclaps (1), timpani (7, 12), cowbell (6), wah wah shaker (6), background vocals (4, 5), 808 drums (10), drum kit (10), shaker (11), snare drum (12), cymbal (12)

Additional personnel
 Jim Scott – vocals
 Roberto "Tiny" Menegoni – percussion
 Party in Studio 3 – Sweet Pea Atkinson, Jane Oppenheimer, Jen Hilliard, and Jim Scott (track 2)
 Sean Cullen and the male cast of "Shave It" (track 7)
 Major Scale courtesy of Chris Brown (track 9)
 Jono Abrams – Faxed thumbs-up (track 12)

Production
 Don Was – producer
 Jim Scott – engineer
 Jen Hiller - assistant engineer
 Katy Teasdale – assistant engineer
 Michael Scotella - additional engineer
 Brian Gardner - mastering

Charts

Weekly charts

Year-end charts

Singles

References 

2000 albums
Barenaked Ladies albums
Albums produced by Don Was
Reprise Records albums
Juno Award for Album of the Year albums
Juno Award for Pop Album of the Year albums